Category 5 Records was an independent record label based in Nashville, Tennessee. Founded in 2005, the label included eight different country music artists in its roster. The label was owned by Raymond Termini and was disestablished in 2009.

History
Category 5 Records was founded in January 2005 by its president, Raymond Termini. Tony Benken, formerly a promotion director of the Broken Bow Records label, was signed as vice president of promotion for Category 5. Carl Strube, formerly president of Critique Records, was the label's vice president and general manager. Portions of the label's proceeds were given to hurricane relief funds.

The first act signed to Category 5 was Craig Hand, whose debut single "Direct Connect" was released in February 2006. Other acts signed to the label included Travis Tritt, Sammy Kershaw, Donovan Chapman, and Jerrod Niemann. Tritt and Kershaw had previously been on major labels, and Chapman was previously on Curb Records. Kershaw's 2006 album Honky Tonk Boots was the label's first full album release.

In 2007, Travis Tritt sued the label for breach of contract and fraud.

Roster
Donovan Chapman
Craig Hand
George Jones (courtesy of Bandit Records)
Sammy Kershaw
Jerrod Niemann
Odiss Kohn
Shauna
Travis Tritt

References

American country music record labels
American independent record labels
Record labels established in 2005
Record labels disestablished in 2009